Daphnella receptoria is a species of sea snail, a marine gastropod mollusk in the family Raphitomidae.

J. Tucker considers this species as a synonym of Clathurina receptoria (Melvill, J.C. & R. Standen, 1901)

Description
The length of the shell attains 18.5 mm, its diameter 6 mm.

A most graceful, dark ocher, fusiform species. It  contains seven angulate whorls. The protoconch is vitreous and purple colored. The subsequent whorls are impressed at the suture. The wide aperture is oblong and is whitish on the inside. The outer lip is lunulate. The columella stands almost upright. The siphonal canal is short.

Distribution
This marine species occurs off the Makran coast, Baluchistan.

References

External links
 Kazmi, Quddusi B., M. Moazzam, and Razia Sultana. "Marine Molluscan fauna Of the Pakistani coastal waters"

receptoria
Gastropods described in 1901